Pandanicola is a genus of fungi in the family Xylariaceae.

References

Xylariales